The Royal Alcázars of Seville, historically known as al-Qasr al-Muriq (The Verdant Palace) and commonly known as the Alcázar of Seville, is a royal palace in Seville, Spain, built for the Christian king Peter of Castile. It was built by Castilian Christians on the site of an Abbadid Muslim alcazar, or residential fortress. The fortress was destroyed after the Christian conquest of Seville in 1248.

The palace is a preeminent example of Mudéjar style in the Iberian Peninsula, combining Romanesque, Gothic, and Renaissance structural elements. The upper stories of the Alcázar are still occupied by the royal family when they visit Seville and are administered by the Patrimonio Nacional. It was registered in 1987 by UNESCO as a World Heritage Site, along with the adjoining Seville Cathedral and the General Archive of the Indies.

Etymology
The term Alcázar comes from the Arabic al-qaṣr, ("the castle" or "the palace", اَلْقَصْر), itself derived from the Latin castrum ("castle").

History

Islamic era 
In the year 712, Seville was conquered by the Umayyad Caliphate. In the year 913–914, after a revolt against Cordoba's government, the first caliph of Al-Andalus Abd al-Rahman III built a fortified construction in place of a Visigothic Christian basilica. It was a quadrangular, roughly square enclosure about 100 meters long on each side, fortified with walls and rectangular towers, and annexed to the city walls. In the 11th century, during the Taifas period, the Abbadid king Al-Mu'tamid expanded the complex southwards and eastwards, with a new southern enclosure measuring approximately 70 by 80 meters. This new palace was called Al Mubarak. Various additions to the construction such as stables and warehouses were also carried out. 

Towards 1150, the Almohad Caliphs began to develop Seville as their capital in Al-Andalus. The Almohad governor extended the fortified complex to the west, nearly doubling its size. At least six new courtyard palaces were constructed in the old enclosures and nine palaces were added in the western extensions. In 1163 the caliph Abu Ya'qub Yusuf made the Alcazar his main residence in the region. He further expanded and embellished the palace complex in 1169, adding six new enclosures to the north, south, and west sides of the existing palaces. The works were carried out by architects Ahmad ibn Baso and 'Ali al-Ghumari. With the exception of the walls, nearly all previous buildings were demolished, and a total of approximately twelve palaces were built. Among the new structures was a very large garden courtyard, now known as the Patio del Crucero, which stood in the old Abbadid enclosure. Between 1171 and 1198 an enormous new congregational mosque was built on the north side of the Alcazar (later transformed in to the current Cathedral of Seville). A shipyard was also built nearby in 1184 and a textiles market in 1196.

There are few remnants of these Islamic-era constructions today. Archaeological remains of the Al Mubarak Palace are currently preserved under Patio de la Monteria. Several wall painting fragments were found that are now exhibited in the Palacio del Yeso. The courtyard buildings now known as the Palacio del Yeso, the Palacio de la Contratación, and the Patio del Crucero all preserve remains from the Almohad period.

Christian era 

With the start of the Christian era in Seville, the Alcazar was converted into the residence of the Christian monarchs. Changes were made to the buildings to fit the needs of the monarchs and the court life. In the years 1364–1366, king Pedro I built the Mudéjar Palace, an example of the Andalusian Mudejar style. Under the Catholic rulers Isabella and Fernando, the upper floor was extended and transformed into the main residence of the monarchs.

The palace was the birthplace of Infanta Maria Antonietta of Spain (1729–1785), daughter of Philip V of Spain and Elisabeth Farnese, when the king was in the city to oversee the signing of the Treaty of Seville (1729) which ended the Anglo-Spanish War (1727).

The palace

The Real Alcázar is situated near the Seville Cathedral and the General Archive of the Indies in one of Andalusia's most emblematic areas. During the five hundred years of construction, various architectural styles succeeded one another. There are no remnants of the initial design, but the structure was probably refurbished with elements of Islamic ornamentation and patterns. Several major gardens were also built. With the start of the Spanish Reconquista in the 13th century, the palace was remodeled with Gothic and Romanesque elements. The 16th century saw major additions built in Renaissance style. Alongside these designs, Islamic decoration and ornamentation was widely used. After damage by the 1755 Lisbon earthquake, that façade of the Palacio Gótico overlooking the Patio del Crucero was completely renovated using Baroque elements. The palace now presents  a unique blend of styles.

Tiles

The palace is known for its tile decoration. The two tile types used are majolica and arista tiles. In the arista technique, the green body is stamped and each tile segment has raised ridges. This technique produces tiles with transparent glazes that are not flat. The art of majolica ceramics was developed later in the 15th–16th centuries. The innovation made it possible to "paint" directly on ceramics covered with white opaque glazes. Being a trade center, Seville had access to large scale production of these tiles. They were mainly of geometric design inspired by arabesque ornamentation.

In the 16th century, the Catholic Monarchs commissioned an Italian artist from Pisa, Francisco Niculoso (called Pisano) to make two majolica tile altarpieces for their private chapel in the palace. One still exists in the oratory of the royal apartments, the other one is missing. Later, the artist Cristóbal de Augusta created a tile-work in the Palacio Gotico. It features animals, cherubs and floral designs and gives the palace a bright tapestry look.

Puerta del León
The main entrance to the Alcázar takes its name from the 19th century tile-work inlaid above it, a crowned lion holding a cross in its claws and bearing a Gothic script.

Patio de las Doncellas 
The name, meaning "The Courtyard of the Maidens", is a reference to the apocryphal story that the Moors demanded an annual tribute of 100 virgins from the Christian kingdoms of Iberia.

The lower storey of the Patio was built for King Peter of Castile and contains inscriptions that refer to Peter as a "sultan".

Several reception rooms are arranged around a long rectangular reflecting pool that runs the entire length of the patio, creating a water line. This pool is surrounded by promenades covered with a red brick pavement decorated with green ceramic borders, similar to the pavement that adorns the perimeter of the garden. The pool and its promenades are bordered by two flowerbeds located one meter beneath the pavement whose sides are decorated with a frieze of interlaced semi-circular arches.

The current appearance is the result of a reconstruction carried out in the 21st century following the excavations carried out between 2002 and 2005 by a team of archaeologists led by Miguel Ángel Tabales. The garden and the pool, built between 1356 and 1366, were buried between 1581 and 1584 and the courtyard was paved by Juan Bautista de Zumárraga with a white and black marble pavement with an alabaster fountain in the center. The patio maintained this appearance until its true structure was discovered and the hidden garden was uncovered after the 2002–2005 excavations, which revealed the good state of conservation of the area under the patio. The ancient Mudejar garden was restored after being hidden for centuries under a marble floor.

Soon after this restoration, the courtyard was temporarily paved with marble once again at the request of English film director Ridley Scott. The paved courtyard was used as the set for the court of the King of Jerusalem in Scott's movie Kingdom of Heaven. The courtyard arrangement was converted once more after the film's production.

The upper story of the Patio was an addition made by Charles V.  The addition was designed by Luis de Vega in the style of the Italian Renaissance although he did include both Renaissance and mudéjar plaster work in the decorations.  Construction of the addition began in 1540 and ended in 1572.

Los Baños de Doña María de Padilla 
The "Baths of Lady María de Padilla" are rainwater tanks beneath the Patio del Crucero.  The tanks are named after María de Padilla, the mistress of Peter the Cruel.

Salon de Embajadores 

The Ambassadors Hall is the ancient throne room built during the reign of Al-Mu'tamid in the 11th century. In the 14th century, Pedro I of Castile remodeled the hall to make it a centerpiece of his royal palace. Plant motifs in plasterwork were added in the corners of the room and spandrels of the arches. Windows were traced with geometric elements. Walls were covered with tiled panels. The orientation of the hall was also changed from facing Mecca to northeast. The doorway now led to the Patio of the Maidens (Patio de las Doncellas). In 1526, Emperor Charles V and Isabella of Portugal celebrated their marriage in this room.

Other sections 

Patio de las Muñecas (Courtyard of the Dolls)
Patio de la Montería (Courtyard of the Montería)
Dormitorio de los Reyes Moros (Bedroom of the Moorish Kings)
Sala de Justicia (Justice room)
Patio del Yeso (Courtyard of the Plaster)
Cuarto del Almirante (Admiral's Room)
Casa de Contratación (Casa de Contratación)
Patio del Crucero (Courtyard of the Crossing)
Palacio Mudéjar or de Pedro I (Mudéjar Palace or that of Peter of Castile) 
Patio de las Muñecas (Courtyard of the Dolls)
Cuarto del Príncipe (Prince's Room)
Patio de las Doncellas (Courtyard of the Maidens)
Salón del Techo de Carlos V (Charles V Ceiling Room)
Salón de Embajadores (Ambassadors' Room)
Salón del Techo de Felipe II (Philip II Ceiling Room)
Primera planta (First level of the Palace of Peter of Castile)
Palacio Gótico (Gothic Palace)
Capilla (Chapel)
Gran Salón (Big Room)
Salón de los Tapices (Tapestries' Room)
Sala de las Bóvedas (Vaults' Room)
Upper floors belong to the Patrimonio Nacional and are occupied by the royal family when visiting Seville. There are many security measures for visitors; admission is approximately 5 euros.
Vestíbulo or Saleta de la Reina Isabel la Católica (Lobby or Queen Isabella the Catholic Monarch's Room)
Anteortaorio de Isabel la Católica (Pre-oratory of Isabella the Catholic Monarch)
Oratorio de Isabel la Católica (Oratory of Isabella the Catholic Monarch)
Alcoba Real (Royal Bedroom)
Antecomedor (Pre-dining Room)
Comedor de Gala (Gala Dining)
Sala de fumar (Smoking Room)
Retrete del Rey (King's Toilet)
Antecomedor de familia, antiguo Cuarto del Rey (Family Pre-dining Room, former King's Room)
Comedor de Familia or Cuarto Nuevo (Family Dining Room or New Room)
Mirador de los Reyes Católicos (Viewpoint of the Catholic Monarchs)
Dormitorio del Rey Don Pedro, antiguo Cuarto de los Lagartos (King Don Peter of Castile's Bedroom, former Lizards' Room)
Despacho de Juan Carlos I (Juan Carlos I's Office)
Cámara de Audiencias (Hearings' Chamber)
Dormitorio de Isabel II (Isabella II's Bedroom)
Colección Carranza (a museum of old azulejos)
Gardens
Estanque de Mercurio (Mercury Pond)
Galería de Grutesco (Grotesque Gallery)
Jardín de la Danza (Dance's Garden)
Jardín de Troya (Troy's Garden)
Jardín de la Galera (The Galley's Garden)
Jardín de las Flores (Flowers' Garden)
Jardín del Príncipe (Prince's Garden)
Jardín de las Damas (Ladies' Garden)
Pabellón de Carlos V (Charles V's Pavilion)
Cenador del León (Lion's Gloriette)
Jardín Inglés (English Garden)
Jardín del Marqués de la Vega-Inclán (Marquis of la Vega-Inclán's Garden)
Jardín de los Poetas (The Poets' Garden)
Apeadero (Mounting-block)
Patio de Banderas (Flags' Courtyard)
Walls of the Alcázar

The gardens
All the palaces of Al Andalus had garden orchards with fruit trees, horticultural produce and a wide variety of fragrant flowers. The garden-orchards not only supplied food for the palace residents but had the aesthetic function of bringing pleasure. Water was ever present in the form of irrigation channels, runnels, jets, ponds and pools.

The gardens adjoining the Alcázar of Seville have undergone many changes. In the 17th century during the reign of Philip III the Italian designer Vermondo Resta introduced the Italian Mannerist style. Resta was responsible for the Galeria de Grutesco (Grotto Gallery) transforming the old Muslim wall into a loggia from which to admire the view of the palace gardens.

In popular culture

In 1962 the Alcázar was used as a set for Lawrence of Arabia.
The Patio de las Doncellas was used as the set for the court of the King of Jerusalem in the 2005 movie Kingdom of Heaven.
Part of the fifth season of Game of Thrones was shot in several locations in the province of Seville, including the Alcázar.

See also
The Virgin of the Navigators
Azulejo
 History of medieval Arabic and Western European domes

References

External links 

 InFocus: Alcázar of Seville (Sevilla, Spain) at HitchHikers Handbook
 Images of the Alcázar in Seville – 105 images with good descriptions of the Alcázar and its history.
 Casa de la Contratación – in depth historical article.
 El Real Alcázar de Sevilla (In Spanish, English and French)
 UNESCO World Heritage
  interiors and details pictures of Seville Alcazar

Seville
Azulejos in buildings in Andalusia
Buildings and structures completed in 914
Buildings and structures completed in the 11th century
Buildings and structures completed in the 14th century
Castles in Andalusia
Gothic architecture in Andalusia
Islamic gardens
Spanish gardens
Mudéjar architecture in Andalusia
Mannerist architecture
Palaces in Seville
Royal residences in Spain
World Heritage Sites in Spain